Euseius is a genus of mites in the Phytoseiidae family.

Species

 Euseius aferulus (Chant, 1959)
 Euseius affinis Qayyum, Akbar & Afzal, 2001
 Euseius africanus (Evans, 1954)
 Euseius ahaioensis (Gupta, 1992)
 Euseius aizawai (Ehara & Bhandhufalck, 1977)
 Euseius alangii (Liang & Ke, 1981)
 Euseius alatus De Leon, 1966
 Euseius albizziae (Swirski & Ragusa, 1978)
 Euseius aleyrodis (El-Badry, 1967)
 Euseius alstoniae (Gupta, 1975)
 Euseius alterno Qayyum, Akbar & Afzal, 2001
 Euseius amabilis Khan, Chaudhri & Khan, 1992
 Euseius amissibilis Meshkov, 1991
 Euseius andrei (Ueckermann & Loots, 1988)
 Euseius apsheronica Abbasova & Mekhtieva, 1991
 Euseius australis (Wu & Li, 1983)
 Euseius badius Khan & Chaudhri, 1991
 Euseius baetae (Meyer & Rodrigues, 1966)
 Euseius bambusae (Ghai & Menon, 1967)
 Euseius batus (Ueckermann & Loots, 1988)
 Euseius beninensis Moraes & McMurtry in Moraes, McMurtry & Yaninek 1989
 Euseius brazilli (El-Banhawy, 1975)
 Euseius brevifistulae Karg, 1997
 Euseius bwende (Pritchard & Baker, 1962)
 Euseius caseariae De Leon, 1967
 Euseius castaneae (Wang & Xu, 1987)
 Euseius circellatus (Wu & Li, 1983)
 Euseius citri (van der Merwe & Ryke, 1964)
 Euseius citrifolius Denmark & Muma, 1970
 Euseius coccineae (Gupta, 1975)
 Euseius coccosocius (Ghai & Menon, 1967)
 Euseius concordis (Chant, 1959)
 Euseius consors (De Leon, 1962)
 Euseius densus (Wu, 1984)
 Euseius dossei (Pritchard & Baker, 1962)
 Euseius dowdi (Schicha, 1993)
 Euseius eitanae (Swirski & Amitai, 1965)
 Euseius elinae (Schicha, 1977)
 Euseius emanus (El-Banhawy, 1979)
 Euseius errabundus De Leon, 1967
 Euseius erugatus (van der Merwe & Ryke, 1964)
 Euseius eucalypti (Ghai & Menon, 1967)
 Euseius facundus (Khan & Chaudhri, 1969)
 Euseius finlandicus (Oudemans, 1915)
 Euseius fructicolus (Gonzalez & Schuster, 1962)
 Euseius fustis (Pritchard & Baker, 1962)
 Euseius ghilarovi Kolodochka, 1988
 Euseius guangxiensis (Wu, 1982)
 Euseius haramotoi (Prasad, 1968)
 Euseius hibisci (Chant, 1959)
 Euseius hima (Pritchard & Baker, 1962)
 Euseius ho (De Leon, 1965)
 Euseius hutu (Pritchard & Baker, 1962)
 Euseius inouei (Ehara & Moraes, 1998)
 Euseius insanus (Khan & Chaudhri, 1969)
 Euseius kalimpongensis (Gupta, 1969)
 Euseius kenyae (Swirski & Ragusa, 1978)
 Euseius kirghisicus (Kolodochka, 1979)
 Euseius lasalasi Denmark & Evans in Denmark, Evans, Aguilar, Vargas & Ochoa 1999
 Euseius lecodactylus Ueckermann, 1996
 Euseius lokele (Pritchard & Baker, 1962)
 Euseius longicervix (Liang & Ke, 1983)
 Euseius longiverticalis (Liang & Ke, 1983)
 Euseius macrospatulatus (Gupta, 1986)
 Euseius magucii (Meyer & Rodrigues, 1966)
 Euseius mangiferae (Ghai & Menon, 1967)
 Euseius mba (Pritchard & Baker, 1962)
 Euseius mediocris Chaudhri, Akbar & Rasool, 1979
 Euseius mesembrinus (Dean, 1957)
 Euseius minutisetus Moraes & McMurtry in Moraes, McMurtry, van den Berg & Yaninek 1989
 Euseius multimicropilis De Leon, 1967
 Euseius mundillovalis (Schicha, 1987)
 Euseius myrobalanus (Ueckermann & Loots, 1988)
 Euseius naindaimei (Chant & Baker, 1965)
 Euseius natalensis (van der Merwe, 1965)
 Euseius neococciniae (Gupta, 1978)
 Euseius neodossei Moraes, Ueckermann & Oliveira in Moraes, Ueckermann, Oliveira & Yaninek 2001
 Euseius neofustis Moraes & McMurtry, 1988
 Euseius neolokele Moraes, Ueckermann & Oliveira in Moraes, Ueckermann, Oliveira & Yaninek 2001
 Euseius neomagucii Ueckermann, Moraes & Oliveira in Moraes, Ueckermann, Oliveira & Yaninek 2001
 Euseius neovictoriensis (Schicha, 1979)
 Euseius nertitus (El-Badry, 1968)
 Euseius nicholsi (Ehara & Lee, 1971)
 Euseius nigeriaensis Moraes, Ueckermann & Oliveira in Moraes, Ueckermann, Oliveira & Yaninek 2001
 Euseius notatus (Chaudhri, 1968)
 Euseius noumeae (Schicha, 1979)
 Euseius nyalensis (El-Badry, 1968)
 Euseius obispensis Aponte & McMurtry, 1997
 Euseius obtectus Khan, Chaudhri & Khan, 1992
 Euseius odoratus Khan & Chaudhri, 1991
 Euseius okumae (Ehara & Bhandhufalck, 1977)
 Euseius olivi (Nasr & Abou-Awad, 1985)
 Euseius orcula Khan, Chaudhri & Khan, 1992
 Euseius orientalis (El-Badry, 1968)
 Euseius orygmus (Ueckermann & Loots, 1988)
 Euseius ovalis (Evans, 1953)
 Euseius ovaloides (Blommers, 1974)
 Euseius pafuriensis (van der Merwe, 1968)
 Euseius papayana (van der Merwe, 1965)
 Euseius passiflorus Denmark & Evans in Denmark, Evans, Aguilar, Vargas & Ochoa 1999
 Euseius plaudus Denmark & Muma, 1973
 Euseius plazo Ahmad, Yasmin & Chaudhri, 1987
 Euseius plebeius (van der Merwe, 1968)
 Euseius ploreraformis (Schicha & Corpuz-Raros, 1992)
 Euseius prolixus (van der Merwe, 1968)
 Euseius pruni (Gupta, 1975)
 Euseius querci (Liang & Ke, 1983)
 Euseius quetzali McMurtry in McMurtry, Badii & Congdon 1985
 Euseius relictus Chaudhri, Akbar & Rasool, 1979
 Euseius reticulatus Moraes, Ueckermann & Oliveira in Moraes, Ueckermann, Oliveira & Yaninek 2001
 Euseius rhododendronis (Gupta, 1970)
 Euseius ricinus Moraes, Denmark & Guerrero, 1982
 Euseius rotundus (Blommers, 1973)
 Euseius rubicolus (van der Merwe & Ryke, 1964)
 Euseius ruiliensis (Wu & Li, 1985)
 Euseius sacchari (Ghai & Menon, 1967)
 Euseius sacchari (Liang & Ke, 1983)
 Euseius sakagamii (Ehara, 1966)
 Euseius scutalis (Athias-Henriot, 1958)
 Euseius semotus Ashmad, Yasmin & Chaudhri, 1987
 Euseius septicus Chaudhri, Akbar & Rasool, 1979
 Euseius sibelius (De Leon, 1962)
 Euseius similiovalis (Liang & Ke, 1983)
 Euseius sojaensis (Ehara, 1964)
 Euseius spermahyphus (Ueckermann & Loots, 1988)
 Euseius stipulatus (Athias-Henriot, 1960)
 Euseius subalatus (De Leon, 1965)
 Euseius subplebeius (Wu & Li, 1984)
 Euseius talinga (Pritchard & Baker, 1962)
 Euseius terenos Ahmad, Yasmin & Chaudhri, 1987
 Euseius transvaalensis (van der Merwe & Ryke, 1964)
 Euseius tularensis Congdon in Congdon & McMurtry 1985
 Euseius tutsi (Pritchard & Baker, 1962)
 Euseius ucrainicus (Kolodochka, 1979)
 Euseius ugandaensis Moraes, Ueckermann & Oliveira in Moraes, Ueckermann, Oliveira & Yaninek 2001
 Euseius unisetus Moraes & McMurtry, 1983
 Euseius urceus (De Leon, 1962)
 Euseius utilis (Liang & Ke, 1983)
 Euseius vanderbergae (Ueckermann & Loots, 1988)
 Euseius victoriensis (Womersley, 1954)
 Euseius vignus Rishi & Rather, 1983
 Euseius vitrum Ahmad, Yasmin & Chaudhri, 1987
 Euseius vulgaris (Liang & Ke, 1983)
 Euseius wyebo (Schicha & Corpuz-Raros, 1992)
 Euseius yousefi (Zaher & El-Brollosy, 1986)
 Euseius zairensis Moraes, Ueckermann & Oliveira in Moraes, Ueckermann, Oliveira & Yaninek 2001
 Euseius zambiaensis Moraes, Ueckermann & Oliveira in Moraes, Ueckermann, Oliveira & Yaninek 2001

References